Tyler Scott Green (born February 18, 1970), is an American former professional baseball pitcher, who played in Major League Baseball (MLB) for the Philadelphia Phillies (–). He is the son of former Oakland Raiders quarterback Charlie Green.

Amateur career

A native of Springfield, Ohio, Green graduated from Thomas Jefferson High School (Denver, Colorado) in 1988, and was named Gatorade National Player of the Year along with Dr. Pepper Colorado Athlete of the Year. The Cincinnati Reds drafted Green as their 2nd pick out of high school, but he opted to attend Division I (D-I) baseball powerhouse Wichita State (WSU) with legendary coaches Gene Stephenson and Brent Kemnitz.

As a freshman starter, Green helped the Shockers (68–16) to an NCAA D-I Championship. Earlier that year, Green was a member of the gold medal-winning Team USA and was the MVP, beating Cuba 8–1 with a complete-game 1-hitter, and at one point retired 17 straight Cuba batters in the 1988 Jr. Olympics in Sydney Australia. His sophomore campaign was highlighted by a 9 inning no-hitter against New Mexico. After his 1989 sophomore season, he played collegiate summer baseball with the Hyannis Mets of the Cape Cod Baseball League, and received the league's “Outstanding Pro Prospect” award given by the coaches and pro scouts.

As a junior, he earned First Team All Missouri Valley Conference, earned All-Tournament recognition and was named Most Outstanding Player of the 1991 MVC Classic. He ranked 7th in the nation in total strikeouts, with 134, and 17th in average strikeouts, with 10.4 strikeouts per 9 innings pitched. Green was chosen as the 10th pick in the first round by the Philadelphia Phillies in the 1991 MLB Draft. On the same day, at the College World Series in Omaha, Nebraska, Green stuck out 14 and combined with teammate Jamie Bluma to beat Creighton University 3–2 in a 12-inning duel that is still acknowledged as one of the best College World Series games in history.

Professional career
After a short stint in the minor leagues, which included a no-hitter vs. Ottawa on July 4, Green made his major league debut as a member of the 1993 National League Champion Philadelphia Phillies where he joined a pitching staff that included Curt Schilling, Terry Mulholland and "Wild Thing" Mitch Williams. “Macho Row” members Lenny Dykstra, Darren Daulton and John Kruk also led that team.

Green's most notable season was in 1995, where he contended for Rookie of the Year along with Hideo Nomo, and after back-to-back complete-game shutouts against the Dodgers and a win against John Smoltz and the Atlanta Braves. Green was also selected to represent the Phillies and the National League in the All-Star Game in Arlington, Texas.

After battling through 4 shoulder and 2 elbow surgeries, Tyler ended his 10-year career as a member of the Kansas City Royals and Cleveland Indians organizations in 2000.

References

External links

1970 births
Living people
Major League Baseball pitchers
Philadelphia Phillies players
National League All-Stars
Baseball players from Ohio
Buffalo Bisons (minor league) players
Wichita State Shockers baseball players
Hyannis Harbor Hawks players
Batavia Clippers players
Clearwater Phillies players
Kinston Indians players
Reading Phillies players
Scranton/Wilkes-Barre Red Barons players